Jake Austin Walker (born June 24, 1997) is an American actor and singer. He is known for his roles as Jared Talbot in the Sundance series Rectify (2013–2016), Henry King Jr. in the DC Universe series Stargirl (2020–2021), and Liam Sadusky in the Disney+ series National Treasure: Edge of History.

Early life 
Walker was born in Hickory, Mississippi.

Career
Walker is also a pop musician.

Filmography

Film

Television

Discography

EPs

Singles

Other appearances

References

External links

Living people
American television actors
1997 births
People from Hickory, Mississippi